The Business College of Shanxi University is an independent college at Shanxi University in Taiyuan, Shanxi Province, in China.   Established in March 2001, the Business College has approximately 17,400 students from Shanxi and other Chinese provinces.  The campus covers 1,000 acres.

The Business College contains an Accounting School, Management School, Information School, Electronic Commerce School, Cultural Communication School, Law School, Foreign Language School, Arts and Design School, Physical Education School, Economics School, Music School, Ideological and Political Education School and Basic Education School.  In total, there are three secondary colleges, ten departments and 65 undergraduate majors. All these have formed a multi-disciplinary integration of disciplinary profession system majoring in management science, economics and literature.  As of 2014, the Business College had 11 faculties, including 51 undergraduate majors.

History
In March 2001, the Business College was approved by the Shanxi Provincial People's Government, Shanxi University  Marketing cooperatives supply and marketing schools co-sponsored its establishment

In 2003, the Ministry of Education recognised the Business College.
In 2006, the School of Finance, journalism, advertising, mathematics and applied mathematics passed the review of the Ministry of Education, and began enrolling students the following year. In May 2009, the Business College was awarded the Shanxi Provincial People's Government, "the province's afforestation advanced unit".

Faculty
In September 2014, the college's official website shows that there are 1134 faculty members, including 829 full-time teachers, more than 180 professors and associate professors, 39 teachers of "Double Teachers", 5 foreign teachers, the provincial teaching teacher more than 10 people, master tutor more than 20 people, 3 doctoral tutor, the provincial quality course teacher 9 people. Provincial teaching teacher 5 people.

Teaching construction
According to the official website of the college in September 2014, the college has built one provincial-level cultural industry talent training base, one provincial-level information security demonstration laboratory, two provincial-level talent training mode innovation experimental area, four provincial excellent courses A, two hospital-level key construction professional.

Academic exchange
The Business College has exchange programs with the American University of Fife, Minot State University, Silicon Valley University, American University, Valdosta University, University of Tiffin, University of Southern New Hampshire, Edinburgh The University of Gifu, Guildford College, Catholic University of Australia, St. Lawrence College in Canada, Japan Rikkyo University, Megumi University, Sendai Bailey Women's University, New College University, Kyoto Information College University, Musashino University, Nagasaki International University, Japanese University of Korea, Gyeonggi University of Korea, Kasumatsu University, Chosun University, Kumasi Industrial College of Ghana,  and Malaysia Century Universitys. College students through the "voluntary enrollment, merit selection" inter-school exchange, the Shuo Lianduo, overseas internships and other projects abroad have the opportunity to study abroad.

Universities and colleges in Shanxi